Wardner Provincial Park is a provincial park in British Columbia, Canada. It is located on the edge of the Kootenay River at the border of Wardner's townsite.

References

Provincial parks of British Columbia
Parks in the Regional District of East Kootenay